Ramsey is a borough in Bergen County, in the U.S. state of New Jersey. As of the 2020 United States census, the borough's population was 14,798, an increase of 325 (+2.2%) from the 2010 census count of 14,473, which in turn reflected an increase of 122 (+0.9%) from the 14,351 counted in the 2000 census.

Ramsey was incorporated as a borough by an act of the New Jersey Legislature on March 10, 1908, from portions of Hohokus Township (whose remnants are now Mahwah Township). Additional territory was annexed from Waldwick in 1921, and portions of the borough were ceded to Saddle River in 1925.

History 
Before European settlement, the area that became Ramsey was occupied by the Lenape Native Americans in the United States.

The most noteworthy local historical site is the Old Stone House, which is, as its name describes, both old and constructed of stone, though its construction materials in the early 1700s also included hog's hair. It was originally a Dutch farmhouse and served as a tavern during the Revolutionary War. Legend has it that Aaron Burr slaked his thirst at this site, on his way to courting the woman who would become his wife in Ho-Ho-Kus. The structure opened as a historic site in 1960 with a display of old pitchers.

Ramsey is named after Peter J. Ramsey, a 19th-century landowner who died , who had sold the land that became the site of a railroad station called "Ramsey's" in 1848.

Geography
According to the United States Census Bureau, the borough had a total area of 5.57 square miles (14.43 km2), including 5.50 square miles (14.25 km2) of land and 0.07 square miles (0.18 km2) of water (1.24%).

The borough is bordered by the Bergen County municipalities of Allendale on the southeast, Mahwah on the north, west, and southwest and by Saddle River and Upper Saddle River on the east.

Demographics

2010 census

The Census Bureau's 2006–2010 American Community Survey showed that (in 2010 inflation-adjusted dollars) median household income was $111,549 (with a margin of error of +/− $8,131) and the median family income was $136,475 (+/− $2,642). Males had a median income of $90,326 (+/− $5,483) versus $63,234 (+/− $6,177) for females. The per capita income for the borough was $52,491 (+/− $36,084). About 1.9% of families and 3.8% of the population were below the poverty line, including 4.4% of those under age 18 and 9.8% of those age 65 or over.

Same-sex couples headed 20 households in 2010, unchanged from 2000.

2000 census
As of the 2000 United States census there were 14,351 people, 5,313 households, and 3,947 families residing in the borough. The population density was 2,583.2 people per square mile (996.6/km2). There were 5,400 housing units at an average density of 972.0 per square mile (375.0/km2). The racial makeup of the borough was 91.62% White, 0.78% African American, 0.10% Native American, 5.85% Asian, 0.01% Pacific Islander, 0.54% from other races, and 1.10% from two or more races. Hispanic or Latino of any race were 2.93% of the population.

There were 5,313 households, out of which 37.7% had children under the age of 18 living with them, 64.4% were married couples living together, 7.4% had a female householder with no husband present, and 25.7% were non-families. 22.6% of all households were made up of individuals, and 7.8% had someone living alone who was 65 years of age or older. The average household size was 2.68 and the average family size was 3.18.

In the borough, the age distribution of the population shows 27.0% under the age of 18, 4.9% from 18 to 24, 30.5% from 25 to 44, 26.3% from 45 to 64, and 11.2% who were 65 years of age or older. The median age was 39 years. For every 100 females, there were 93.3 males. For every 100 females age 18 and over, there were 88.9 males.

The median income for a household in the borough was $88,187, and the median income for a family was $104,512. Males had a median income of $75,017 versus $43,205 for females. The per capita income for the borough was $41,964. About 1.4% of families and 1.9% of the population were below the poverty line, including 2.2% of those under age 18 and 2.5% of those age 65 or over.

Economy
The Ramsey Farmers Market includes vendors offering locally sourced produce, foods, beverages and flowers at the Ramsey NJ Transit Station on Main Street every Sunday throughout the year.

Corporate residents of Ramsey have included:
 Flight Centre, parent company of Liberty Travel and GOGO Worldwide Vacations, was located at 69 Spring Street. The company announced in February 2016 that they were relocating to Montvale.
 Konica Minolta's U.S. offices are in Ramsey.
 Okonite, based in Ramsey.

The most common industries for females in Ramsey, according to City-data.com, from 2008 to 2012:
Health care and social assistance (22%)
Educational services (16%)
Finance and insurance (11%)
Manufacturing (10%)
Professional, scientific, and technical services (8%)
Retail trade (8%)
Other services, except public administration (5%)

The most common industries for males in Ramsey, according to City-Data.com, from 2008 to 2012:
Finance and insurance (17%)
Manufacturing (13%)
Professional, scientific, and technical services (10%)
Construction (9%)
Retail trade (8%)
Wholesale trade (7%)
Educational services (7%)

Arts and culture
Ramsey had an old-style downtown cinema with two screens. It closed in 2013, but reopened in 2014 after a successful Kickstarter campaign raised the funds needed for updated projection systems. However, it closed for good in 2020 due to hardships from the COVID-19 pandemic.

Ramsey has six houses of worship. These include: First Presbyterian Church, Lutheran Church of the Redeemer, St. Paul's Roman Catholic Church, St. Paul's Ukrainian Catholic Church, St. John's Episcopal Church, and Grace Baptist Church.

Parks and recreation
This is one of the reasons that the borough, while about 98.5% developed, has retained a "rural ambience".

Ramsey Golf and Country Club, located on Lakeside Drive, has an 18-hole golf course, the Lakeside Grille restaurant, swimming pool, picnic area, playground, tennis courts and a banquet room.

Finch Park, located on Church Street, Gertzen Plaza, and Island Avenue, has a playground, picnic areas, eight baseball and softball fields, a street hockey rink, and basketball courts. There is a memorial for the attacks on September 11, 2001, with its own parking area located on Gertzen Plaza. The park is headquarters of the Ramsey Recreation Commission, and home fields of the Ramsey Baseball and Softball Association.  In the summer months, the Rec Commission has a summer camp in Finch Park for Ramsey students in kindergarten to 7th grade.

The Ramsey Municipal Pool, located on East Oak Street, has a newly renovated pool and waterslides, a recreational field and pavilion, and beach volleyball and basketball courts.

Behind Ramsey High School, there are five tennis courts and a running track that are open to public use.  The RHS football field and the newly built Creamer Field are two of the four fields with night lights in Ramsey, the other two are located at the MacFarran Field complex on Williams Drive, overlooking Route 17.

Behind Tisdale Elementary School, there are two softball fields that are open to the community.

Suraci Pond, located on Woodland Avenue, is a small lake with areas to fish, picnic benches, and hiking trails.  A similar recreational area exists at Garrison Pond on Lake Street.  An Eagle Scout Project from Ramsey's Troop 31 installed picnic tables and restored the flower bed.

Government

Local government

Ramsey is governed under the Borough form of New Jersey municipal government, which is used in 218 municipalities (of the 564) statewide, making it the most common form of government in New Jersey. The governing body is comprised of a Mayor and a Borough Council, with all positions elected at-large on a partisan basis as part of the November general election. A Mayor is elected directly by the voters to a four-year term of office. The Borough Council is comprised of six members elected to serve three-year terms on a staggered basis, with two seats coming up for election each year in a three-year cycle. The Borough form of government used in Ramsey is a "weak mayor / strong council" government in which council members act as the legislative body with the mayor presiding at meetings and voting only in the event of a tie. The mayor can veto ordinances subject to an override by a two-thirds majority vote of the council. The mayor makes committee and liaison assignments for council members, and most appointments are made by the mayor with the advice and consent of the council.

, the Mayor of the Borough of Ramsey is Republican Deirdre A. Dillon, whose term of office ends December 31, 2026. Members of the Ramsey Borough Council are Council President Peter Kilman (R, 2024), Judith Cusick (R, 2023), Michael W. Gutwetter (R, 2023), Glen J. Popolo (R, 2025), Sara Poppe (R, 2024) and Jane M. Woods (R, 2025).

In January 2015, the Borough Council selected Peter Kilman from a list of three candidates nominated by the Republican municipal committee to fill the seat expiring in 2015 that held by Deirdre A. Dillon vacant since she was sworn in as mayor that month. In November 2015, Kilman was elected to serve a full three-year term.

Joseph Verdone was chosen in August 2012 to fill the vacant seat expiring in December 2014 of Bruce Vozeh following his resignation the previous month to become the municipal administrator.

Federal, state and county representation
Ramsey is located in the 5th Congressional District and is part of New Jersey's 39th state legislative district.

Politics
As of March 2011, there were a total of 9,705 registered voters in Ramsey, of which 2,133 (22.0% vs. 31.7% countywide) were registered as Democrats, 2,712 (27.9% vs. 21.1%) were registered as Republicans and 4,849 (50.0% vs. 47.1%) were registered as Unaffiliated. There were 11 voters registered as Libertarians or Greens. Among the borough's 2010 Census population, 67.1% (vs. 57.1% in Bergen County) were registered to vote, including 91.3% of those ages 18 and over (vs. 73.7% countywide).

In the 2016 presidential election, Republican Donald Trump received 4,132 votes (49.3% vs. 41.1% countywide), ahead of Democrat Hillary Clinton with 3,872 votes (46.2% vs. 54.2%) and other candidates with 373 votes (4.5% vs. 4.6%), among the 8,426 ballots cast by the borough's 11,000 registered voters, for a turnout of 76.6% (vs. 72.5% in Bergen County). In the 2012 presidential election, Republican Mitt Romney received 4,333 votes (57.0% vs. 43.5% countywide), ahead of Democrat Barack Obama with 3,167 votes (41.7% vs. 54.8%) and other candidates with 62 votes (0.8% vs. 0.9%), among the 7,598 ballots cast by the borough's 10,342 registered voters, for a turnout of 73.5% (vs. 70.4% in Bergen County). In the 2008 presidential election, Republican John McCain received 4,417 votes (54.7% vs. 44.5% countywide), ahead of Democrat Barack Obama with 3,556 votes (44.0% vs. 53.9%) and other candidates with 59 votes (0.7% vs. 0.8%), among the 8,076 ballots cast by the borough's 10,046 registered voters, for a turnout of 80.4% (vs. 76.8% in Bergen County). In the 2004 presidential election, Republican George W. Bush received 4,606 votes (58.4% vs. 47.2% countywide), ahead of Democrat John Kerry with 3,207 votes (40.7% vs. 51.7%) and other candidates with 52 votes (0.7% vs. 0.7%), among the 7,886 ballots cast by the borough's 9,754 registered voters, for a turnout of 80.8% (vs. 76.9% in the whole county).

In the 2013 gubernatorial election, Republican Chris Christie received 69.9% of the vote (3,162 cast), ahead of Democrat Barbara Buono with 29.1% (1,316 votes), and other candidates with 1.1% (48 votes), among the 4,599 ballots cast by the borough's 9,948 registered voters (73 ballots were spoiled), for a turnout of 46.2%. In the 2009 gubernatorial election, Republican Chris Christie received 2,945 votes (55.8% vs. 45.8% countywide), ahead of Democrat Jon Corzine with 1,945 votes (36.8% vs. 48.0%), Independent Chris Daggett with 343 votes (6.5% vs. 4.7%) and other candidates with 24 votes (0.5% vs. 0.5%), among the 5,280 ballots cast by the borough's 9,866 registered voters, yielding a 53.5% turnout (vs. 50.0% in the county).

Education
Ramsey has a highly educated population. Based on data from the American Community Survey, it was ranked as one of the top 15 most educated municipalities in New Jersey with a population of at least 10,000, placing No. 2 on the list. With 40.3% of residents having a bachelor's degree or higher, the borough was second only to Hoboken (with 50.2%).

The Ramsey Public School District serves students in pre-kindergarten through twelfth grade.  As of the 2021–22 school year, the district, comprised of five schools, had an enrollment of 2,598 students and 252.2 classroom teachers (on an FTE basis), for a student–teacher ratio of 10.3:1. Schools in the district (with 2021–22 enrollment data from the National Center for Education Statistics) are 
Mary A. Hubbard Elementary School with 371 students in grades PreK–3, 
Wesley D. Tisdale Elementary School with 332 students in grades PreK–3, 
John Y. Dater Elementary School with 385 students in grades 4–5, 
Eric S. Smith Middle School with 647 students in grades 6–8 and 
Ramsey High School with 828 students in grades 9–12.

Students from Saddle River's Wandell School attend the district's middle school and then have the option of attending either Ramsey High School or Northern Highlands Regional High School as part of sending/receiving relationships with the Saddle River School District and each of the respective districts.

Ramsey High School was the 30th-ranked public high school in New Jersey out of 328 schools statewide in New Jersey Monthly magazine's September 2012 cover story on the state's "Top Public High Schools", after being ranked 33rd in 2010 out of 322 schools listed. The magazine ranked the school 13th in 2008 out of 316 schools.

Public school students from the borough, and all of Bergen County, are eligible to attend the secondary education programs offered by the Bergen County Technical Schools, which include the Bergen County Academies in Hackensack, and the Bergen Tech campus in Teterboro or Paramus. The district offers programs on a shared-time or full-time basis, with admission based on a selective application process and tuition covered by the student's home school district.

The Roman Catholic Archdiocese of Newark oversees the operation of the Academy of St. Paul, a K–8 school and Don Bosco Preparatory High School, an all-boys Roman Catholic high school for grades 9–12 founded in 1915 and overseen by the Salesians of Don Bosco. In 2015, the Academy of St. Paul was one of 15 schools in New Jersey, and one of six private schools, recognized as a National Blue Ribbon School in the exemplary high performing category by the United States Department of Education.

Transportation

Roads and highways

A number of roadways serve Ramsey and its neighboring communities, providing the borough with easy driving access to New York State (including New York City) and other points within New Jersey. Route 17 and County Route 507 intersect the areas east and north of Ramsey's downtown business district, while Interstate 287 and U.S. Route 202 pass through the Darlington section of Mahwah to the west and the New York State Thruway (Interstate 87 / Interstate 287) and NY Route 59 run through Suffern, New York to the north.

Public transportation
Ramsey has two NJ Transit train stations which provide mass transit access to and from Hoboken Terminal with connections available at Secaucus Junction to Penn Station New York in Midtown Manhattan and other NJ Transit lines. Located on Main Street just east of Central Avenue in the borough's downtown area, the Ramsey Main Street station was constructed in 1868 by the Paterson and Ramapo Railroad and is the oldest operating passenger station in service in New Jersey. The Ramsey Route 17 station, which opened on August 22, 2004, is a park-and-ride facility and regional commuter hub located along Route 17 South in the northern section of town. Both of these stations are stops along NJ Transit's Main Line and Bergen County Line.

Short Line provides bus service along Route 17 (with limited service at other local stops) to the Port Authority Bus Terminal in Midtown Manhattan.

Popular culture
Films
Some scenes from the movie World Trade Center (2006) were filmed in a house in Ramsey.
Television
A segment of Rescue 911, Season 1, episode 2 features two young residents from Ramsey who were saved from an oncoming freight train.
Scenes from "The Happy Wanderer" episode of the HBO series The Sopranos were shot at the Maple Shade Motel, and scenes from the episode "Bust Out" were filmed at the Ramsey Outdoor store.

Notable people
 
People who were born in, residents of, or otherwise closely associated with Ramsey include:

 Danny Aiello (1933–2019), stage and film star lived in Ramsey for many years during the 1980s and 1990s
 Adrienne Asch (1946–2013), blind bioethicist who was founding director of the Center for Ethics at Yeshiva University
 Tom Austin, drummer and lyricist for the 1950s / 1960s rock band The Royal Teens, best known for their one hit "Short Shorts"
 Edd Cartier (1914–2008), pulp magazine illustrator
 John Colaneri (born 1981), television presenter, reality TV show host and home makeover expert
 Mike Dietze (born 1989), professional soccer player who played for the Philadelphia Fury of the American Soccer League
 Louise Eisenhardt (1891–1967), early neuropathologist who was the first woman to serve as president of the American Association of Neurological Surgeons
 Jeremiah Fraites (born 1986), co-founder and drummer of the musical group The Lumineers
 Thomas E. Franklin (born 1966), Award-winning photographer for The Record, perhaps best known for his photograph Raising the Flag at Ground Zero
 Jonathan Halyalkar, child actor who played Billy on the 1980s sitcom Who's the Boss?
 Henry Herx (1933–2012), film critic whose reviews were intended for Catholic moviegoers
 Charles Ernest Hosking Jr. (1924–1967), United States Army Master Sergeant and Medal of Honor recipient; Hosking Way, a road off Darlington Avenue, is named in his honor
 Walter Johnsen (born 1950), Chairman and CEO of Acme United Corporation
 Bridget Anne Kelly, former Deputy Chief of Staff to Governor of New Jersey Chris Christie
 Mike Laga (born 1960), former professional baseball player who is the only player to hit a foul ball completely out of Busch Memorial Stadium in St. Louis
 Maria LaRosa, on-camera meteorologist for The Weather Channel
 Bob McAdoo (born 1951), former New York Knicks player lived in Ramsey during the 1970s/1980s/1990s
 Ryan McGinley (born 1977), photographer named Photographer of the Year in 2003 by American Photo Magazine
 Bill Pellington (1927–1994), linebacker who played 12 seasons in the NFL for the Baltimore Colts
 Jimmie Rivera (born 1989), professional mixed martial artist who competes in UFC as a bantamweight
 Ariel A. Rodriguez (1947–2017), judge who served as acting Justice of the New Jersey Supreme Court
 Pete Rohrman (born 1970), political activist and the New Jersey Libertarian Party nominee in New Jersey's 2017 gubernatorial election
 Wesley Schultz (born 1982), guitarist and lead vocalist of The Lumineers
 Tommy Sweeney (born 1995), tight end for the Buffalo Bills
 Justin Trattou (born 1988), defensive end for the Minnesota Vikings and former player on the New York Giants
 Buck Williams (born 1960), NBA All-Star who lived in Ramsey during the 1980s while playing for the New Jersey Nets

References

Sources
 Municipal Incorporations of the State of New Jersey (according to Counties) prepared by the Division of Local Government, Department of the Treasury (New Jersey); December 1, 1958.
 Clayton, W. Woodford; and Nelson, William. History of Bergen and Passaic Counties, New Jersey, with Biographical Sketches of Many of its Pioneers and Prominent Men., Philadelphia: Everts and Peck, 1882.
 Harvey, Cornelius Burnham (ed.), Genealogical History of Hudson and Bergen Counties, New Jersey. New York: New Jersey Genealogical Publishing Co., 1900.
 Van Valen, James M. History of Bergen County, New Jersey. New York: New Jersey Publishing and Engraving Co., 1900.
 Westervelt, Frances A. (Frances Augusta), 1858–1942, History of Bergen County, New Jersey, 1630–1923, Lewis Historical Publishing Company, 1923.

External links

 Ramsey Borough website
 Ramsey Public School District
 
 School Data for the Ramsey Public School District, National Center for Education Statistics
 Ramsey Free Public Library
 Ramsey Police
 Ramsey Volunteer Rescue Squad
 Ramsey Volunteer Ambulance Corps
  Ramsey Office of Emergency Management
 Ramsey Volunteer Fire Department
 Ramsey Historical Society
 Postcards of Historical Ramsey, NJ
 Ramsey Cinema Closed Future Unknown
 Ramsey Country Club
 Finch Park Creative Playground

 
1908 establishments in New Jersey
Borough form of New Jersey government
Boroughs in Bergen County, New Jersey
Populated places established in 1908